William West (born 1 December 1931) is a Canadian former Star Class sailor who competed in the 1960 Summer Olympics and in the 1964 Summer Olympics. He was born in Vancouver, British Columbia.

References

 

1931 births
Possibly living people
Sportspeople from Vancouver
Canadian male sailors (sport)
Olympic sailors of Canada
Sailors at the 1960 Summer Olympics – Star
Sailors at the 1964 Summer Olympics – Star